This is a list of commercial banks in Senegal

 Attijariwafa Bank	
 Bank of Africa Sénégal	
 International Commercial Bank	
 Banque Atlantique Sénégal
 Banque Régionale de Solidarité	
 Banque de l'Habitat du Sénégal	
 Société Générale de Banques au Sénégal (SG-BS)	
 Ecobank Sénégal	
 Banque Sénégalo-Tunisienne	
 Crédit Lyonnais Sénégal	
 Banque Agricole	
 Citibank Sénégal	
 Compagnie Bancaire de l'Afrique Occidentale	
 Banque Islamique du Sénégal	
 Banque des Institutions Mutualistes d'Afrique de l'Ouest 	
 Banque Sahélo-Saharienne pour l'Investissement et le Commerce (BSSIC)	
 Banque Internationale pour le Commerce et l'Industrie du Sénégal (BICIS)
 United Bank for Africa
 Banque Régionale des Marchés
 Banque de Dakar (BDK)

External links
 Website of Central Bank of West African States
 Partial Listing of Commercial Banks in Senegal 
 UBA Outlines Expansion Plans

See also
 List of banks in Africa
 Central Bank of West African States
 Economy of Senegal

References

 
Banks
Senegal
Senegal